Radio Dei is a Christian radio station in Finland. It broadcasts on 89.0 MHz in the Greater Helsinki metropolitan area, and simulcasts on other frequencies in most other major Finnish cities. Radio Dei also simulcasts over the Internet, through its website.

Programming
In addition to broadcasting Christian music, Radio Dei offers STT news every hour, and general talk radio programs. In particular, the station's most listened-to programs are Taivaan ja Maan väliltä, by  broadcast on Saturday late evenings, and Raamattu kannesta kanteen, by the  missionary organization.

External links

Radio stations in Finland
Christian radio stations in Europe
Radio stations established in 1997